Project Runway Australia 4 is the fourth installment of the reality competition Project Runway Australia, airing on Arena. The series premiered on 8 October 2012.

Overview

Some changes have been made to the judging panel since the third season. Jarryd Clarke and Kirrily Johnston, judges on the previous season, did not return due to work commitments. They were replaced by fashion designer Peter Morrissey and stylist and fashion director of Harper's Bazaar Australia, Claudia Navone. Megan Gale returns as host and head judge, and Alex Perry returns as mentor to the designers.

Contestants

Models
Leah Jay
Rachel Riddel
Ebony Edwards
Ruby Hunter
Jae Lin
Zoe Demkiw
Holly Caiulo
Lili Hart
Rosa Solomon

Challenges

 The designer won the competition
 The designer won the challenge
 The designer was eliminated
 The designer had a high score for the challenge
 The designer came in second but did not win the challenge
 The designer had a low score for the challenge
 The designer was in the bottom two
 The designer withdrew from the competition
 The designer was brought back into the competition
 The designer advanced to Fashion Week.

: William and Natalie, the bottom 2 of challenge one, were given a second chance in the competition. Along with a standard elimination in challenge two, William and Natalie must compete head-to-head, with one of the two additionally being eliminated.
: In the 10th episode, Jordan & Christina were bought back to show their collections to Alex, and create one more look. based on his decision, one would rejoin the competition and become the last finalist. Christina re-entered and eventually won.
: In the winners announcement, Megan simply named Christina as the Winner. Leah, Jamie and Tristan were all named runners-up, and their specific rankings were not specified.

Episode summaries

Episode one

Original airdate: 8 October 2012

The first challenge of the season required the designers to create garment of their choosing to showcase who they are as a designer. No one was sent home, however Natalie and William (the bottom two) were required to compete head-to-head in the next challenge, with one of the two going home.

 Guest Judge: Miranda Kerr
 Winner: Savva
 Out: No one

Episode two

Original airdate: 15 October 2012

The designers were tasked with creating a sleek and sophisticated outfit made from materials purchased at The Reject Shop.

 Guest Judge: Fleur Wood
 Winner: Leah
 Out: Natalie & Natashya

Episode three

Original airdate: 22 October 2012

The challenge required the designers to create a commercial, white women's shirt and an accompanying outfit. The winning designer's white shirt would be featured in Madison Magazine and sold in Witchery stores in Australia, with proceeds going to ovarian cancer research.

 Guest Judge: Lizzie Renkert
 Winner: Tristan
 Out: Mladen

Episode four

Original airdate: 29 October 2012

The remaining designers were required to create an on-trend menswear look for a tradesman. As the winner of the previous challenge, Tristan could choose his client first, and pair up the rest of the designers and tradesmen.

 Guest Judge: Joe Farage
 Winner: Christina
 Out: Sasha-Rose

Episode five

Original airdate: 5 November 2012

Alex awoke the designers and took them to the Melbourne Museum in order to present their challenge; to form teams and create a demi-couture collection inspired by their surroundings. Christina could join the team she wanted for winning the previous challenge, and the entire winning team would be safe.

Alex later tasked the teams with creating a 5th look to open their collections.

 Guest Judge: Toni Maticevski
 Winning Team: Team Dragonfly
 Winner: Jamie
 Out: Alexandra

Episode six

Original airdate: 12 November 2012

The designers were tasked with creating a show-stopping garment featuring volume and curve using environmental shopping bags of various colours.

 Guest Judge: Glynis Traill-Nash 
 Winner: William
 Out: Savva

Episode seven

Original airdate: 19 November 2012

The remaining designers were paired up with teenage girls and tasked with creating a dress for them to wear to their school formal. For winning the last challenge, William got to allocate each designer their budget.

 Guest Judges: Genevieve & Alexandra Smart 
 Winner: Leah
 Out: William

Episode eight

Original airdate: 26 November 2012

The challenge for this week had the designers creating a dress for singer and television personality Natalie Bassingthwaighte to wear to a music awards show. Later, Alex tasked the designers to create an additional dress for Natalie to wear to an after party. Designers could only choose 2 fabrics, could not share or use the same fabrics as others, and had two extra hours to finish both looks.

 Guest Judges: Natalie Bassingthwaighte & Nicole Bonython-Hines 
 Winner: Jamie
 Out: Jordan

Episode nine

Original airdate: 3 December 2012

 Winner: Jamie 
 Out: Christina

In this challenge, contestants had to design an outfit that would later have a photo shoot. Christina got eliminated after her black ruffled dress looked far too tortured for the runway, however the judges decide to being her back afterwards.

Episode ten

Original airdate: 10 December 2012

 Winner: No one

Episode eleven

Original airdate: 17 December 2012

 Winner: Christina
 Out: Jamie, Leah, and Tristan

References

Season 04
2012 Australian television seasons
2012 in fashion